Vadim Valentinovich Evseev (born 8 January 1976) is a Russian football coach and a former player who is a former Russian international. He is the manager of Shinnik Yaroslavl.

Playing career

Club
Evseev started to play for the Dynamo football school. In 1990, after having been left out of the international tournament in France, he moved to the Lokomotiv school. After two years at Spartak Mytishchi, in 1993 he was invited to play for the reserve team of Spartak Moscow.

He debuted for the Spartak's first team on 6 March 1996, in the Champions League quarterfinal against Nantes. In 1998 Evseev spent the second half of the season on loan in Torpedo Moscow.

Evseev played in Lokomotiv Moscow since 2000. He was then dropped to the reserve team in 2006 after having an argument with the new manager Anatoly Byshovets. By the start of the 2007 Russian Premier League he was in newly relegated to the First Division Torpedo Moscow, but failed to accommodate and was subsequently sold to Saturn Moscow Oblast in the summer of 2007.

In his farewell friendly match he was substituted for the 5-year-old son of a children's charity director, who went on to score.

International
Evseev debuted in the national team on 31 March 1999 in a match against Andorra. His only goal for Russia was scored on 19 November 2003 in a Euro 2004 qualification playoff against Wales at the Millennium Stadium. This goal was the only one in a two-leg tie. Evseev's post-match reaction (namely, shouting russian profanities into the camera) has been subject of much media attention.

International goal
Scores and results list Russia's goal tally first.

Coaching career
On 27 March 2019, he signed a 2-year contract as a manager of Russian Premier League FC Ufa. On 7 October 2020, he left Ufa by mutual consent.

On 1 June 2021 he signed with Shinnik Yaroslavl, freshly relegated to the third-tier FNL 2. On 16 May 2022, Shinnik secured their promotion back to Russian Football National League after one season down.

Honours
Spartak Moscow
 Russian Premier League (4): 1996, 1997, 1998, 1999
 Russian Cup: 1998

Lokomotiv Moscow
 Russian Premier League (2): 2002, 2004
 Russian Cup (2): 2000, 2001
 Russian Super Cup: 2003

References

External links
Profile 
Russia – Record International Players

1976 births
Living people
People from Mytishchi
Russian footballers
Russia international footballers
Russia under-21 international footballers
Russian expatriate footballers
Expatriate footballers in Belarus
FC Spartak Moscow players
FC Spartak-2 Moscow players
FC Torpedo Moscow players
FC Lokomotiv Moscow players
UEFA Euro 2004 players
Association football defenders
FC Saturn Ramenskoye players
Russian Premier League players
Russian football managers
FC Torpedo-BelAZ Zhodino players
FC Arsenal Tula players
Russian Premier League managers
FC Amkar Perm managers
FC SKA-Khabarovsk managers
FC Ufa managers
FC Shinnik Yaroslavl managers
Sportspeople from Moscow Oblast